Jorge Ignacio Manduca Aglieri (born 27 October 1979) is an Argentine retired footballer as goalkeeper.

External links
 
 Jorge Manduca at Football-Lineups
 

1979 births
Living people
Argentine people of Italian descent
Argentine footballers
Argentine expatriate footballers
Unión de Santa Fe footballers
San Marcos de Arica footballers
Coquimbo Unido footballers
Deportes Copiapó footballers
A.C. Barnechea footballers
Primera B de Chile players
Chilean Primera División players
Expatriate footballers in Chile
Association football goalkeepers
Footballers from Santa Fe, Argentina